Raissa Oliveira Santana (born July 6, 1995) is a Brazilian model and beauty pageant titleholder who won Miss Brasil 2016. She represented Brazil at Miss Universe 2016 pageant.

Personal life
Santana is a model and a Marketing student in Brazil. She is the second Miss Brasil winner of Afro-Brazilian descent, after Deise Nunes (1986).

Pageantry

Miss Brasil 2016
Santana was crowned Miss Brasil 2016 representing Paraná on October 1, 2016.

Miss Universe 2016
Santana represented Brazil at Miss Universe 2016 where she placed in the Top 13.

References

External links
Miss Brasil pageant official site

1995 births
Brazilian beauty pageant winners
Brazilian female models
Afro-Brazilian female models
Living people
Miss Brazil winners
Miss Universe 2016 contestants
People from Umuarama